GWP may refer to:

 Galbreath Wildlands Preserve, in California
 Gallup World Poll
 Gas Works Park, in Seattle, Washington
 Gentle Wind Project, a new age movement
 German Wirehaired Pointer, a breed of dog
 Gigawatt-peak (GWp)
 Global warming potential, as well as synonyme Greenhouse warming potential
 Global Water Partnership
 Gross world product